TBI may refer to:

Medicine

 toe-brachial index, a parameter for the diagnosis of peripheral arterial disease
 Total body irradiation, a form of radiation therapy used most commonly in bone marrow transplantation
 Tracheobronchial injury, an injury to the trachea or main bronchi
 Traumatic brain injury, a physical trauma to the brain
 Triamcinolone benetonide, a glucocorticoid

Other
 TBI plc, an airport owner and operator
 Tennessee Bureau of Investigation, the criminal investigative arm of the state government of Tennessee
 The Bourne Identity (novel), a 1980 spy thriller by Robert Ludlum
 The Bourne Identity (2002 film), a film adaptation of the novel
 Trade Bank of Iraq, a publicly owned bank headquartered in Baghdad, Iraq
 TBI Bank, a privately owned bank headquartered in Sofia, Bulgaria
 Throttle Body Injection, a type of fuel injection system used on internal combustion engines
 TBI Solicitors, a UK-based law firm
 Task-based instruction, an alternative name for task-based language learning, an approach to language learning and language teaching
 Television Business International, a magazine published in the UK by KNect365, the Knowledge & Networking division of Informa

See also